The 2019–20 season is Brown's 5th consecutive season in the second division of Argentine football, Primera B Nacional.

The season generally covers the period from 1 July 2019 to 30 June 2020.

Review

Pre-season
On 7 June 2019, both Marcelo Lamas and Nicolás Benegas switched Brown for fellow Primera B Nacional team Defensores de Belgrano. Iván Silva's loan from Newell's Old Boys was extended on 11 June. A day later, Leonardo Zaragoza became departure number three as he joined Estudiantes (BA), though the club did soon announce their first incomings. Gastón Grecco was followed in the door by goalkeeper Mauro Ruggiero, signing respectively from Cañuelas and Flandria. Further outgoings were confirmed in the days after, with Alexis Vega (Temperley) and Maximiliano Resquín (Colegiales) leaving. Brown announced five arrivals on 26 June, with the loans of Elías Contreras and Nahuel Rodríguez being followed by Ezequiel Bonacorso, Iván Becker and Tomás Molina.

Juan Manuel Olivares, after rejecting a new contract with Brown, signed for Defensores de Belgrano on 26 June; player number three to make that move. Matías Cortave was the seventh name to leave on 27 June, as he went to Deportivo Morón. Paraguayan midfielder Rodrigo Burgos, from Talleres (C), joined them on that day, before Matías Ruiz Sosa made it nine to go by penning a deal with Comunicaciones. Numerous loans from the previous campaign officially expired on and around 30 June. Fernando Enrique came through the door soon after, as did Guillermo Sotelo. Ignacio Liporace departed to Atlético de Rafaela on 3 July, as forward Lucas Campana left for Estudiantes (BA). Ariel Kippes and Mauricio Carrasco made moves in on 4 July.

Luciano Nieto penned terms from Bolivian club Sport Boys by Pablo Vicó on 7 July. The manager secured his fourteenth new addition on 10 July in Felipe Cadenazzi from Mitre. Matías Linas, from relegated Los Andes, came to Adrogué after Cadenazzi on 11 July. Talleres (RE) revealed Adrián Maidana had swapped Brown for them on 13 July. On 17 July, Brown met Quilmes in their first pre-season friendly - subsequently suffering a goalless draw and a 2–1 loss. Two days later, they shared victories with Tristán Suárez in matches in Adrogué. Brown reinforced with a player on loan from Huracán on 23 July, as Fernando Cosciuc signed for one season. During which time, Brown played out two draws with the reserves of Defensa y Justicia at the Estadio Lorenzo Arandilla.

On 29 July, Brown were held to a goalless tie by San Telmo in a friendly - prior to losing to the Primera B Metropolitana outfit in the day's secondary encounter. Brown sealed consecutive 2–0 wins at home to Liniers on 7 August, with Tomás Molina notching a brace to secure the initial victory. Valentín Otondo (Olimpo) and Alex Sosa (Huracán) became new reinforcements for Pablo Vicó's squad on 14 August.

August
Brown opened their Primera B Nacional campaign with a score draw at home to Atlético de Rafaela on 17 August, with Alberto Stegman popping up with their goal. They grabbed their opening set of points a week later, as Luciano Nieto scored twice in a three-goal win away to All Boys. A first half goal from Matías Córdoba condemned Brown to defeat against Gimnasia y Esgrima (J) on 31 August.

Squad

Transfers
Domestic transfer windows:3 July 2019 to 24 September 201920 January 2020 to 19 February 2020.

Transfers in

Transfers out

Loans in

Friendlies

Pre-season
Friendly encounters with Quilmes was scheduled, on 21 June 2019, for 17 July. Tristán Suárez revealed matches with them on 28 June; for 20 July. They'd also face Defensa y Justicia Reserves, San Telmo and Liniers.

Competitions

Primera B Nacional

Results summary

Matches
The fixtures for the 2019–20 league season were announced on 1 August 2019, with a new format of split zones being introduced. Brown were drawn in Zone B.

Squad statistics

Appearances and goals

Statistics accurate as of 3 September 2019.

Goalscorers

Notes

References

Club Atlético Brown seasons
Brown